Ganeriwala family are a Marwari family, connected with the financial, social and cultural history of Rajasthan. Through the 19th and early 20th century, members of the family were financiers and money lenders in the princely state, and they served as treasurers for the royal families of the state. A common trait among the traditional banking families of Rajasthan, members of the Ganeriwala family have been credited for the construction of various Hindu temples and haveli’s in Rajasthan.

Shobharam Birla, the grandfather of Raja Baldeo Das Birla, worked with the Ganeriwala family, before the Birlas emerged as the leading industrialists of India.

Shivaji was known to be a frequent visitor of the Ganeriwala Haveli holding close ties with their family patriarch. In the 1800s, Seth Puranmal Ganeriwala’s branch of the family separated from the rest to become treasurers and bankers of the Nizams of Hyderabad, namely Osman Ali Khan, Asaf Jah VII, the worlds richest man at a point. This was not acceptable to the rest of the family who believed their family duties lied in serving a Hindu ruler.

However, Seth Puranmal Ganeriwala stuck to his Hindu roots and built one of Hyderabad’s most famous Hindu temples - Sitaram Bagh Temple (now being managed by Dr. Arvind Kumar Ganeriwal and his family).

The Great prefix was the result of the Great firm theory applied to the Marwari family businesses like the Geat Ganeriwala firm, Great Tarachand (promoted by Neotia's, patriarchs of Ambuja Cement Ltd) and Great Sevaram Ramnikhdas Neotia's became leading agents of Burma Shell before forming Ambuja Cements Ltd.
Ganeriwala family trusts consist of temples, schools, wells and dharmashalas since the 1800s. The Sitaram Bagh temple at Hyderabad was built by Seth Puranmal Ganeriwala, in 1830s who had also built the noted Rangji temple in Pushkar in 1850. Mody University of Laxhmangarh is built on land donated by the Ganeriwala family. Sitaram Bagh temple is spread over 25 acres and classified as a heritage property. Shree Raghunathji Mandir in Nashik was donated by mother of Seth Ram Dutt Ganeriwala over a 120-acre land. Geeta Vatika also known as Geeta Garden in Gorkahpur was built on the land donated by Seth Jaydayal Ganeriwala. Haveli's belonging to the descendants include ones in Fatehpur, Mukundgarh, Lakshmangarh, Ratnagarh.The Char Chawk Ki Haveli is the largest haveli of Shekhawati, owned by several branches of the Ganeriwala family previously and now managed and lead by Shri Girdharilalji Ganeriwala. Other temples near Jaipur include ones in Ratnagarth, Mukundgarh, Fatehpur, Sirsa, Ganeri etc.

Ganeriwala family trusts consist of: temples, schools, wells and dharmashalas since the 1800s. The Sitaram Bagh temple at Hyderabad was built by Seth Puranmal Ganeriwala, in 1830s who had also built the noted Rangji temple in Pushkar in 1850. Mody University of Laxhmangarh is built on land donated by the Ganeriwala family. Sitaram Bagh temple is spread over 25 acres and classified as a heritage property. Shree Raghunathji Mandir in Nashik was donated by mother of Seth Ram Dutt Ganeriwala over a 120-acre land. Geeta Vatika also known as Geeta Garden in Gorkahpur was built on the land donated by Seth Jaydayal Ganeriwala. Haveli's belonging to the descendants include ones in Fatehpur, Mukundgarh, Lakshmangarh, Ratnagarh.The Char Chawk Ki Haveli is the largest haveli of Shekhawati, owned by several branches of the Ganeriwala family previously and now managed and lead by Shri Girdharilalji Ganeriwala. Other temples near Jaipur include ones in Ratnagarth, Mukundgarh, Fatehpur, Sirsa, Ganeri etc.

Besides various famous legacy of ancestors of Ganeriwals from Burma, Kolkata, Hyderabad, the new generation of Ganeriwals is not far too behind. The newer generation of this wonderful legacy continues to add an arrow to the quiver of Ganeriwala family name. Some of the notable trailblazers of this clan are celebrity dietician Mummun Ganeriwal . Ritesh Ganeriwal head of investment advisory at Syfe, Anirudh Ganeriwal of Food Darzi, Dr. Simran Ganeriwal Cleveland. 
Not to forget the youngest climate activists sisters Dhaanya and Reaha Ganeriwal from Hong Kong. They are only 9yr and 11yr old sisters to deliver their first TEDx talk.

References

10.https://www.youtube.com/watch?reload=9&v=VoDjoDOKEOw

11.https://www.tatlerasia.com/power-purpose/front-female/six-sustainability-influencers-to-follow-in-hong-kong

12.https://www.scmp.com/yp/discover/news/hong-kong/article/3162574/hong-kong-youth-climate-activists-aged-8-and-10-striking

13.https://www.greenpeace.org/eastasia/blog/7072/lets-talk-about-climate-change-who-cares-about-cop26-4-young-climate-activists-in-hong-kong-tell-you-more/

14.https://www.arounddb.com/around-db-articles/just-do-it-sisters-act/

15.https://coffeeandconversations.in/tag/my-green-mantra/

Ethnic groups in India
Social groups of Rajasthan
Bania communities